Heritage Park is a 24-acre (9.7 ha) state-owned park adjacent to the campus of the Washington State Capitol, Capitol Lake and downtown Olympia, Washington.

References

Parks in Olympia, Washington
Washington State Capitol campus